The Camp White Sulphur Springs Confederate Cemetery is an American Civil War cemetery in Arkansas. It is located northeast of the village of Sulphur Springs, also known as White Sulphur Springs, in Jefferson County.

History
The American Civil War started in April 1861 and White Sulphur Springs became a staging and training area for troops who came into Pine Bluff to be organized into units. In late July 1861, the 9th Arkansas Infantry Regiment was organized and trained at White Sulphur Springs and remained there for about a month before being shipped out to Tennessee.  A few months later the Fagan's Guard, which later became the 2nd Arkansas Infantry Battalion, camped and trained near the springs before going on to Virginia.

By the spring of 1862, the war had reached Arkansas and the Battle of Pea Ridge, in the north part of the state, was fought. It had become evident that the Union Army had come to stay and would attempt to take the state by marching on Little Rock.  However, most of the Confederate Army was ordered to leave the state and go across the Mississippi River to help defend against the Union invasion of Mississippi.  This left Arkansas almost totally defenseless.  Protests were made to the Confederate government, and the governor of the state started raising another army.  The governor stopped troops from Texas that were headed east through Arkansas on their way to join the war.  Many of them trained in White Sulphur Springs and fought in military actions in Arkansas.  The Confederate Hospital was moved to White Sulphur Springs from Pine Bluff and was set up in the Poole Hotel which was the Female High School and the Methodist Church.

Troops that arrived at White Sulphur Springs from Texas and Oklahoma brought a measles epidemic with them and many of them died from the disease before even seeing a battlefield.  Those who died were either buried in the Camp White Sulphur Springs Confederate Cemetery, which was near the Poole Hotel hospital, or where their camps were located throughout the community.

Camp White Sulphur Springs became a Confederate military base of operation for the defense of the Lower Arkansas and White Rivers, located nine miles southwest of Pine Bluff, Arkansas, which contained several encampments of instruction and organization of new recruits.  These Camps, such as Camp Lee, Camp R. G. Shaver's, Camp Holmes, and other smaller camps were all located within one mile of the community of present-day Sulphur Springs in Jefferson County, Arkansas, which served as a Headquarters, Commissary, and Hospital facility for these operations.

It was used as a campground by a number of Arkansas, Texas and Louisiana units between late 1861 and early 1863. Many soldiers died of disease and were buried in this cemetery. Units known to have camped at the site include the 19th, 24th, 28th and 33rd Arkansas Infantry and Hart's Arkansas Battery, Nutt's and Denson's Louisiana Cavalry Companies, the 6th and 17th Texas Infantry and the 24th and 25th Texas Cavalry, Dismounted.

See also
 National Register of Historic Places listings in Jefferson County, Arkansas

References

External links

 Camp White Sulphur Springs Confederate Cemetery at Encyclopedia of Arkansas History & Culture
 

1862 establishments in Arkansas
Cemeteries in Jefferson County, Arkansas
Cemeteries on the National Register of Historic Places in Arkansas
Confederate cemeteries in Arkansas
National Register of Historic Places in Jefferson County, Arkansas
Tourist attractions in Jefferson County, Arkansas
Cemeteries established in the 1860s